The 1985 Virginia Tech Hokies football team represented the Virginia Polytechnic Institute and State University during the 1985 NCAA Division I-A football season. The team's head coach was Bill Dooley.

Schedule

Players
The following players were members of the 1985 football team.

References

Virginia Tech
Virginia Tech Hokies football seasons
Virginia Tech Hokies football